The Azerbaijan Cup 2005–06 was the 14th season of the annual cup competition in Azerbaijan with the final taking place on 3 June 2006. Sixteen teams competed in this year's competition. Baku were the defending champions.

Round of 16
The first legs were played on November 3 and 4 while the second legs were played on November 18 and 19, 2005.

|}

Quarterfinals
Three of the ties first legs were played on March 3 and 04, with their second legs being played on March 17 and 18, 2006. The exception to this was the MKT Araz vs Khazar-Lenkoran tie which was played on April 24 and 27.

|}

Semifinals
The first legs were played on April 25 and May 3, 2006. The second legs were played on May 3 and 7, 2006.

Final

Notes 
Qarabağ have played their home games at the Tofiq Bahramov Stadium since 1993 due to the ongoing situation in Quzanlı.

References

External links
 Official page 
 Soccerway

Azerbaijan Cup seasons
Azerbaijan Cup 2005-06
Azerbaijan Cup 2005-06